Sir Thomas Aston, 1st Baronet (29 September 1600 – 24 March 1645) was an English politician who sat in the House of Commons in 1640. He fought for the Royalist cause in the English Civil War. The portrait he commissioned from John Souch of his first wife Magdalene Aston on her deathbed is in Manchester Art Gallery. He is known as an apologist for the Church of England.

Background
Aston was born in Shropshire, the eldest son of John Aston of Aston, Cheshire and his wife Maud Needham, daughter of Robert Needham. His uncle was the soldier Arthur Aston. He matriculated at Brasenose College, Oxford on 28 March 1617, aged 16, and graduated with a Bachelor of Arts on 8 July 1619. In 1620, he was called to the bar by Lincoln's Inn.

Aston was created a baronet of Aston, in the County of Chester by King Charles I of England on 25 July 1628 . He was appointed High Sheriff of Cheshire in 1635. In April 1640 he was elected Member of Parliament for Cheshire in the Short Parliament.

Civil War
When the First English Civil War broke out between the king and parliament, Aston took part with the Royalists, and was in command at Middlewich in March 1643, when he was defeated by Sir William Brereton in the First Battle of Middlewich. The Royalists lost two cannons and five hundred stand of arms. Few were killed, but the prisoners included many of the principal Royalists who took part, and the town suffered at the hands of the Parliamentarians, who made free with the property of burgesses and the plate of the church. Aston escaped, but when a few days later he returned to Chester, he was placed under arrest at Pulford, where he wrote a defence of his conduct which furnishes a very minute account of the affair. William Axon stated in his biography on Aston in the DNB that this was an interesting picture of the civil war.

Aston apparently freed himself from censure and rejoined the king's army and indeed is said to have suffered a second defeat from Brereton at Macclesfield in 1643. He was afterwards captured in a skirmish in Staffordshire. When in prison at Stafford he tried to escape, but the attempt was discovered by a soldier who struck him on the head. This and other wounds received in the war brought on a fever, of which he died at Stafford on 24 March 1645, aged 44.

Marriage and children

Aston married firstly in 1627 Magdalene Pulteney, daughter of Sir John Pulteney and they had two sons and two daughters, who all died young. Magdalene died in 1635, and she is remembered because of the painting that he commissioned from John Souch showing him by her deathbed.

He remarried in 1639 to Anne Willoughby, the daughter of Sir Henry Willoughby, 1st Baronet. By his second wife he had two daughters and another son Willoughby, who succeeded his father as baronet. Aston was survived by his wife until 1688.

Notes

References

Davies, Clarice Stella (1976), A history of Macclesfield, Manchester University Press ND, 

Attribution

1600 births
1645 deaths
Baronets in the Baronetage of England
Cavaliers
Members of Lincoln's Inn
English MPs 1640 (April)
High Sheriffs of Cheshire